Brian Cusworth (born March 9, 1984) is a retired American professional basketball player.

Early life and career
Brian Cusworth started playing basketball at the age of nine in 1993 in his hometown St. Louis. After graduating high school he went to study at Harvard University (from which he graduated with a degree in biology in 2006) and played NCAA basketball at Harvard Crimson team for three seasons.

Professional career
In 2007, he went to play in Europe and signed a deal with Estonian top team Tartu Ülikool/Rock. He was one of the team's top performers during the season and helped Rock to FIBA EuroCup semifinals. He also won the Estonian National Championship with the team.

From 2009 to 2011 he played for Bàsquet Manresa which he abandon due to an injury.

On November 1, 2012, Cusworth signed with the Maine Red Claws. On December 3, he was waived by the Red Claws.

In January 2013 he joined and then left Ratiopharm Ulm.

Achievements
Estonian National Championship 2007–08
Estonian League Most Valuable Player 2007–08
Estonian League Finals MVP 2007–08
Estonian Basketball Cup runner-up 2007–08
FIBA EuroCup runner-up 2007–08

References

External links
Harvard Crimson stats 2002–2007 at ESPN
FIBA EuroCup stats 2007–2008 at fibaeurope.com
Baltic League stats 2007–2008 at bbl.net

1984 births
Living people
American expatriate basketball people in Estonia
American expatriate basketball people in Germany
American expatriate basketball people in Spain
American men's basketball players
Basketball players from St. Louis
Bàsquet Manresa players
CB Breogán players
Centers (basketball)
Harvard Crimson men's basketball players
Korvpalli Meistriliiga players
Liga ACB players
Maine Red Claws players
Ratiopharm Ulm players
Tartu Ülikool/Rock players